Telescopium is a genus of cone-shaped sea snails in the family Potamididae.

Species
Species within the genus Telescopium include:
 Telescopium telescopium (Linnaeus, 1758)
 Species brought into synonymy
 † Telescopium gigas K. Martin, 1881: synonym of † Campanile martini Matsubara, 2009  (invalid: secondary junior homonym of Campanile gigas Leymerie, 1851; C. martini is a replacement name)
 Telescopium indicator Montfort, 1810: synonym of Telescopium telescopium (Linnaeus, 1758) (a junior synonym)
 Telescopium mauritsi Butot, 1954: synonym of Telescopium telescopium (Linnaeus, 1758) (a junior synonym)

References

 http://paleodb.org/bridge.pl?a=checkTaxonInfo&taxon_no=10556&is_real_user=1
 Brandt, R. A. M. (1974). The non-marine aquatic Mollusca of Thailand. Archiv für Molluskenkunde. 105: i-iv, 1-423
 Vaught, K.C. (1989). A classification of the living Mollusca. American Malacologists: Melbourne, FL (USA). . XII, 195 pp
 Yamanaka, T.; Mizota, C. (2001). Sulfur Nutrition of Gastropods and Bivalves Relevant to the Mangrove Forests: A Case Study from Central Sumatra, Indonesia. Venus (Journal of the Malacological Society of Japan). 60 (1-2): 71-78

External links
 Montfort P. [Denys de. (1808-1810). Conchyliologie systématique et classification méthodique des coquilles. Paris: Schoell. Vol. 1: pp. lxxxvii + 409 [1808]. Vol. 2: pp. 676 + 16 (1810) (before 28 May).]
 Neave, Sheffield Airey. (1939-1996). Nomenclator Zoologicus vol. 1-10 Online.

Potamididae
Monotypic gastropod genera